Peter Kursinski (born 15 August 1956) is a retired German football forward.

References

External links
 

1956 births
Living people
German footballers
Bundesliga players
VfL Bochum players
VfL Bochum II players
Place of birth missing (living people)
Association football forwards